Gonder is a surname. Notable people with the surname include:

Fernand Gonder (1883–1969), French pole vaulter
Jesse Gonder (1936–2004), American baseball player
Mamu Ram Gonder (Daunkal) (1947–2020), Indian politician
Ted Gonder (born 1990), American non-profit executive